Beloved Antichrist is the sixteenth full-length album by Swedish symphonic metal band Therion. It is a triple album and was released on 9 February 2018 by Nuclear Blast Records. The album is the soundtrack to a rock musical by the band, who are accompanied by a large orchestra and choir. The staging of the rock musical was delayed indefinitely due to the Covid-19 pandemic. Instead, the band started to work on the next regular album Leviathan.

Beloved Antichrist was the band's first release of new original material since Sitra Ahra in 2010. Group founder Christofer Johnsson had toyed with the idea of writing an opera for 15 years and had finally decided to "do metal/rock music with opera" instead, citing his inability to write "the ‘boring’ stuff" like recitatives. Thus, Beloved Antichrist features exclusively operatic singing combined with an orchestra and electric instruments typical of a rock band.

The music was composed by Johnsson, Thomas Vikström, Linnéa Vikström and Christian Vidal, the lyrics were written by Per Albinsson and the album cover was created by Thomas Ewerhart. The album consists of 46 songs and is inspired by and partly based on "A Short Tale of the Antichrist" by Vladímir Soloviov. Johnsson expanded the story to include 27 characters played by 15 vocalists.

Reception

Beloved Antichrist has received generally favorable reviews. AllMusic said of the album: "taken as intended, as a whole, it is an exhausting, enthralling monolithic marvel." Another reviewer described that the album would be a challenge for new Therion fans, but also described it as "Christofer Johnsson’s masterpiece" which "takes everything that Therion has done to this point to a completely different level."

Track listing

Personnel 
 Christofer Johnsson - guitars, keyboards, programming, Hammond organ, orchestral arrangement
 Sami Karppinen - drums 
 Thomas Vikström - lead vocals 
 Nalle "Grizzly" Påhlsson - bass
 Christian Vidal - guitar
 Lori Lewis - vocals
 Chiara Malvestiti - vocals

Charts

References

2018 albums
Nuclear Blast albums
Therion (band) albums